This is a list of oil pipelines.

Africa
 Chad–Cameroon pipeline – Chad–Cameroon
 Sudeth pipeline – South Sudan–Ethiopia (under construction)
 Transnet Pipelines – South Africa
 Sumed pipeline – Egypt
 Tazama Pipeline – Tanzania– Zambia
 Nembe Creek Trunk Line – Nigeria
CPMZ-Mozambique-Zimbabwe Pipeline company-Mozambique
 [KMPP] Khartoum-Madani Petroleum Products Pipeline - [inside SUDAN]
 Kenya pipeline – Kenya

Asia
 Afghanistan Oil Pipeline (planned)
 Alashankou–Dushanzi Crude Oil Pipeline
 Baku–Tbilisi–Ceyhan pipeline
 Baku–Supsa Pipeline
 Baku–Novorossiysk pipeline
 Caspian Pipeline Consortium
 Eastern Siberia–Pacific Ocean oil pipeline
 Habshan–Fujairah oil pipeline
 Paradip-Haldia-Barauni crude oil pipeline
 Kabrai–Dhanbad cutter pipeline
 Kandla–Gorakhpur LPG pipeline (planned)
 Kazakhstan–China oil pipeline
 Kirkuk–Banias pipeline
 Kirkuk–Ceyhan Oil Pipeline
 Koyali–Mohanpura product pipeline
 Mumbai–Manmad Pipeline
 Mundra–Delhi pipeline
 Mundra–Panipat crude oil pipeline
Motihari-Amlekhgunj Oil Pipeline
 Paradip-Haldia-Barauni crude oil pipeline
 PS Pipeline
 Samsun–Ceyhan Pipeline
 Sino-Burma pipelines
 South–North Pipeline Korea
 Trans-Arabian Pipeline, a.k.a. Tapline (defunct)
 Trans-Israel pipeline
 Trans-Korea Pipeline
 Rojkov-Goto Pipeline
 Trans-Caspian Oil Pipeline – planned
 Salaya–Mathura crude oil pipeline
 White Oil Pipeline in Pakistan

Europe

 Adria oil pipeline
 AMBO pipeline
 Baltic Pipeline System
 Brent System
 Burgas-Alexandroupoli pipeline
 CLH (company)
 Druzhba pipeline
 Forties pipeline system
 Grozny-Tuapse pipeline
 Ninian pipeline
 Odessa-Brody pipeline - Poland/Ukraine
 Pan-European Pipeline
 Transalpine Pipeline
 South European Pipeline
 TRAPIL – France

Americas

Northern America

Canada

United States 
 ATEX Pipeline
 Big Inch
 Buckeye Partners
 Calnev Pipeline
 Chaparral NGL Pipeline
 Colonial Pipeline
 Dakota Access Pipeline
 Dixie Pipeline
 Double H Pipeline
 Dow Pipeline Company
 Enbridge Pipeline System
 Enterprise Products
 Jayhawk and Kaw Pipelines
 Keystone Pipeline (XL phase halted in January 2021, XL phase terminated in June 2021)
 Lakehead Pipeline
 Line 3 pipeline
 Longhorn Pipeline
 Magellan Midstream Partners
 Mahadeva Pipeline
 Mariner East Pipelines
 Mid-America Pipeline System
 Minnesota Pipeline
 North Dakota Pipeline
 Olympic Pipeline
 Plantation Pipeline
 Pilgrim Pipeline (proposed)
 Pony Express Pipeline
 Seaway Pipeline
 Seminole Pipeline
 Trans-Alaska Pipeline System
 Trans Mountain Pipeline
 Unev Pipeline
 Yellowstone Pipeline

Other pipelines 
 Sand Hills Pipeline: This pipeline is being developed by DCP Midstream. It will extend for 700 miles from West to East Texas and have an initial capacity of approximately 120,000 barrels per day. The first segment of the pipeline opened in October 2012.
 Pecos River Pipeline: Developed by Bridger Group and Advantage Pipeline, the Pecos River Pipeline will provide a link from the Delaware Basin to the Gulf Coast. The pipeline will run from the Pecos, Texas, to Crane, Texas, where it will connect to the Longhorn Pipeline. The Pecos River Pipeline will have an initial capacity of 150,000 barrels per day.
 Sterling III Pipeline: Under development from Oneok Partners, the Sterling III Pipeline will extend from parts of Texas and Oklahoma in the Mid-Continent Region to the Gulf Coast, and have a capacity of approximately 193,000 barrels per day.

Latin America 

 Activo de Burgos pipeline network – Mexico
 Burgos–Monterrey pipeline – Mexico
 Cadereyta pipeline – Mexico
 Ecopetrol pipelines – Colombia
 OCP pipeline – Ecuador
 Oil tanking pipeline – Argentina
 PDVSA pipelines – Venezuela
 PEMEX pipelines – Mexico
 Petroandina pipeline – Argentina (under construction)
 Recope pipelines – Costa Rica
 San Fernando pipeline – Mexico
 SOTE pipeline – Ecuador
 Tamazunchale pipeline – Mexico
 TGN pipeline network – Argentina
 TGI pipeline network – Colombia
 TGS pipeline network – Argentina
 Trans-Isthmian pipeline – Panama
 Transpetro pipelines – Brazil
 North Peruvian Pipeline (Oleoducto Norperuano) – Petroperú, Peru

See also
 List of natural gas pipelines
 List of oil refineries
 Pipeline transport

References

External links
 Global Fossil Infrastructure Tracker

Energy-related lists